Henry Lyonnet, real name Alfred Copin, (1853 - 4 February 1933) was a French writer. He is mostly known for his studies on the history of theatre, and specifically for his Dictionnaire des comédiens français.

Main works 
under the name Alfred Copin :
 Histoire des comédiens de la troupe de Molière, Paris, L. Frinzine, 1886.
 Études dramatiques. Talma et la Révolution, Paris, L. Frinzine, 1887.
 Études dramatiques. Talma et l'Empire, Paris, L. Fruizine, 1887.
 Les Maisons historiques de Paris, Paris, A. Dupret, 1888.

Under the pseudonym Henry Lyonnet :
 À travers l'Espagne inconnue, Barcelone, Richardin, R. Lamm et Cie, 1896.
 Le Théâtre hors de France. 1 série : Le Théâtre en Espagne, Paris, P. Ollendorff, 1897.
 Le Théâtre hors de France. 2 série : Le Théâtre au Portugal, Paris, P. Ollendorff, 1898.
 Le Théâtre hors de France. 3 série : Le Théâtre en Italie, Paris, P. Ollendorff, 1900.
 Le Théâtre hors de France. 4 série : Pulcinella et compagnie, le théâtre napolitain, Paris, P. Ollendorff, 1901.
 Dictionnaire des comédiens français (ceux d'hier). Biographie, bibliographie, iconographie, Genève, Bibliothèque de la Revue universelle internationale illustrée, 1902-1908, 2 vol.
 Other edition : Paris, Librairie de l'art du théâtre, (1904), 2 vol.
 Reimpression : Genève, Slatkine, 1969, 2 tomes en 1 vol.
 La Mort de Jocrisse, comedy in 1 act, Paris, Librairie Molière, 1904.
 Le Premier de l'An d'un cabot, véridique aventure en 1 acte, s.l., 1909.
 Les "Premières" de Molière, Paris, Delagrave, 1921.
 Les "Premières" de P. Corneille, Paris, Delagrave, 1923.
 Les "Premières" de Jean Racine, Paris, Delagrave, 1924.
 Les "Premières" d'Alfred de Musset, Paris, Delagrave, 1927.
 "Le Cid" de Corneille, Paris, E. Malfère, 1929.
 Cervantès, Nancy-Paris-Strasbourg, Berger-Levrault, 1930. 
 Les Comédiennes, Paris, M. Seheur, 1930.
 "La Dame aux camélias" d'Alexandre Dumas, Paris, Société française d'éditions littéraires et techniques, 1930.
 Les "Premières" de Victor Hugo, Paris, Delagrave, 1930.

19th-century French writers
20th-century French dramatists and playwrights
Theatre in France
Historians of theatre
1853 births
1933 deaths